DeSoto High School can refer to:

 DeSoto High School (Texas), DeSoto, Texas
 De Soto High School (Kansas), De Soto, Kansas
 De Soto High School (Wisconsin), De Soto, Wisconsin
 De Soto High School (Missouri), De Soto, Missouri

See also
 DeSoto Central High School, Southaven, Mississippi
 DeSoto County High School, Arcadia, Florida
 North DeSoto High School, Stonewall, Louisiana